Urodinychidae is a family of mites in the order Mesostigmata.

Genera
The family Urodinychidae contains the following genera:

 Mengzongella Kontschán, Wang & Neményi, 2021
Urodinychus Berlese, 1903
 Uroobovella Berlese, 1903
 Vinicoloraobovella Hirschmann, 1979

References

Mesostigmata
Acari families